is a feminine Japanese given name.

Possible spellings
Shizuko can be written in hiragana, katakana, kanji, or with a combination of kana and kanji.
 , spelled with hiragana and kanji
 , spelled with katakana and kanji
 , "quiet/calm, child"
 , "motives, sea port, child"

People with the name
 Shizuko Gō, Japanese novelist
 Shizuko Ihara, Japanese enka singer professionally known as Mina Aoe
 Susana Shizuko Higuchi Miyagawa, Japanese Peruvian politician and engineer. Ex-wife of former Peruvian president Alberto Fujimori.
 Shizuko Hoshi, Japanese American actress and theatre director. Widow of Japanese actor Makoto "Mako" Iwamatsu.
 Shizuko Kasagi, Japanese jazz singer and actress
 Shizuko Minase, daughter of Viscount Tadasuki Minase of Japan and wife of Prince Kuni Taka of Japan. Mother of Princess Hatsuko, Prince Yoshihiko, Princess Kuniko, Prince Iehiko, and Prince Norihiko of Japan.
 Shizuko Natsuki, Japanese author
 Shizuko Nogi, daughter of samurai Yuji Sadano and wife of Count Maresuke Nogi
 Shizuko Sakashita, Japanese gymnast
 Shizuko Tōdō, Japanese novelist and essayist
 Wakamatsu Shizuko, Japanese educator, translator, and novelist

Fictional characters
 Shizuko Amaike, female character in Fortune Arterial
 Shizuko Azumi, female character in Cat Girl Alliance
 Shizuko Kaga (female character in Maid Sama!
 Shizuko Myojin, adoptive mother of Takeru Myojin in anime Godmars
 Shizuko Yamamura, mother of Sadako Yamamura in Koji Suzuki's 1991 novel Ring
 Shizuko (Cha Ju-Ran), female character in The Silenced, South Korean mystery-thriller movie
 Shizuko Mizutani, female character in My Little Monster

Japanese feminine given names